Komi Station (古見駅) is the name of two train stations in Japan:

 Komi Station (Aichi)
 Komi Station (Okayama)

See also
 Koumi Station
 Kōmi Station